Mauga is a village in Savai'i island in Samoa.

Mauga may also refer to:

Mauga Palepoi (died 1963), American Samoan chief and politician
Joshua Mauga (born 1987), American football player
Lemanu Peleti Mauga (born 1949), American politician and governor of American Samoa

See also